Herzwerk ("Heart-work") is the debut album by German industrial metal band Megaherz. It was a self-released album and was released in 1995. Several of the tracks were later remastered and re-released on Wer bist du?.

Track listing 
 "Die Krone der Schöpfung – An ein Kind" (The Pride of Creation – To a Child) - 4:34
 "Zeit" (Time) - 4:08
 "Negativ" (Negative) - 3:38
 "Teufel im Leib'" (Possessed by the Devil) - 4:20
 "Komm' her" (Come here) - 3:53
 "Hänschenklein 1995" (Little Hans 1995) - 4:05
 "Wir sterben jung" (We're dying young) - 5:14
 "Sexodus" - 4:46 (bonus track)
 "Spring' in die Schlucht" (Jump into the Ravine) - 4:37 (bonus track)
 "Die Krone der Schöpfung – Das Ende" (The Pride of Creation – The End) - 2:21 (bonus track)

1995 albums
Megaherz albums